Hykie Berg (born 2 May 1978), is a South African actor. He is best known for the role of 'Darius du Buisson' in the television serial Egoli: Place of Gold and role 'Conrad Bester' in the soap opera, Binnelanders. In 2011, he won the fourth season of the reality competition Survivor South Africa.

Personal life
He was born on 2 May 1978 in Pretoria, South Africa. He studied up to grade 8 at Hoërskool Die Wilgers where he started using drugs. Then he matriculated in 1998. At the age of 19, he became a heroin addict. He then received drug rehabilitation within a maximum-security cell at the Weskoppies Psychiatric Hospital, Pretoria.

From 1997 and 1999, he completed a Bachelor of Commerce in Marketing – Second Year, Marketing/Marketing Management General degree at University of Pretoria. Then he graduated with a Bachelor's degree in Dramatic Arts in Arts, Entertainment, and Media Management from Stellenbosch University between 1999 and 2002.

He was previously married to Melissa Jacobs in 2013 but got divorced in 2018. He then proposed to his girlfriend Gerridene on 23 June 2019 and they got married in March 2020.

Career
He made television debut in the popular youth series The Res in 2003. Then in 2004, he made a starring role in the serial Plek van Meats. In 2007, he made in his debut film role in Ouma se Slim Kind. In 2004, he joined the cast of the season 13 of the television serial Egoli: Place of Gold and played the role 'Darius du Buisson' in which he won a Crystal Award. He played the role for three seasons up to season 15 in 2007.

In 2018, he became an author where he published the book Hykie Berg: Ultimate Survivor. The book deals with his drug addict life and near death at his peak in acting career, where he finally manages to rehabilitate and achieve the success after.

Filmography

References

External links
 
 Hykie Berg: 'I was in Weskoppies about Ritalin'

Living people
South African male television actors
South African male film actors
1978 births
People from Pretoria